Robert Wingfield (died 1454), of Letheringham, was an English knight.

Robert Wingfield may also refer to:

Robert Wingfield (diplomat) (1464–1539), MP for Great Grimsby
Robert Wingfield (died 1596), MP for Suffolk
Robert Wingfield (historian) (c. 1513–c. 1561), English historian